KTKB may refer to:

 KTKB-FM, a radio station (101.9 FM) licensed to Agana, Guam
 KTKB-LP, a low-power television station (channel 26) licensed to Tamuning, Guam